The 1971 Pepsi Cola Grand Prix was a professional tennis circuit held that year. It incorporated three of the four grand slam tournaments, the Grand Prix tournaments. It was the second edition of the Grand Prix circuit and was run by the International Lawn Tennis Federation (ITLF). In addition to regular tournament prize money a bonus prize money pool of £60,000 ($150,000) was available to be divided among the 20 highest ranking players after the last tournament. To be eligible for a share of the bonus pool a player had to compete in a minimum of nine tournaments. The circuit culminated in a Masters event in Paris, France for the seven highest point scoring players. Stan Smith was the winner of the circuit with 187 ranking points and four tournament victories.

Schedule

Key

April

May

June

July

August

September

October

December

Standings

Grand Prix rankings

List of tournament winners
The list of winners and number of singles titles won, listed alphabetically by last name:
 Arthur Ashe (2) Charlotte, Stockholm Open
 Gerald Battrick (2) Bournemouth, Hilversum
 Bob Carmichael (1) Auckland
 Phil Dent (1) Sydney Outdoor
 Cliff Drysdale (2) Miami WCT, Brussels
 Jaime Fillol (1) Tanglewood
 Željko Franulović (4) New York, Macon, Indianapolis, Buenos Aires
 Andrés Gimeno (1) Hamburg
 Pancho Gonzalez (1) Los Angeles
 Tom Gorman (1) Columbus
 Clark Graebner (3) Salisbury, Merion, South Orange
 Thomaz Koch (1) Caracas
 Jan Kodeš (2) Catania, French Open
 Rod Laver (5) London, Rome, Fort Worth WCT, Berkeley, Bologna WCT
 Robert Lutz (1) Sacramento
 Alex Metreveli (1) Hobart
 Ilie Năstase (6) Richmond, Hampton, Nice, Monte Carlo, Båstad, Masters
 John Newcombe (6) Philadelphia, Chicago WCT, Dallas WCT, Wimbledon, Gstaad, Montreal
 Tom Okker (2) Louisville WCT, Quebec WCT
 Manuel Orantes (1) Barcelona WCT
 Cliff Richey (1) Houston
 Marty Riessen (1) Tehran WCT
 Ken Rosewall (7) Australian Open, Newport, Washington WCT, Boston WCT, Vancouver WCT, Dallas, Australian Open
 Stan Smith (4) Paris, Queen's Club, Cincinnati, US Open
 Roger Taylor (1) Palermo

The following players won their first title in 1971:
 Gerald Battrick Bournemouth
 Bob Carmichael Auckland
 Phil Dent Sydney Outdoor
 Jaime Fillol Tanglewood
 Andrés Gimeno Hamburg
 Tom Gorman Columbus
 Clark Graebner Salisbury
 Robert Lutz Sacramento
 Alex Metreveli Hobart
 Marty Riessen Tehran
 Roger Taylor Palermo

See also
 1971 World Championship Tennis circuit
 1971 Virginia Slims Circuit

Notes

References

External links
 ATP – 1971 Grand Prix tournaments.
 History Men's Professional Tours.

Further reading

 
Grand Prix tennis circuit seasons
Grand Prix